H'Hen Niê (born 15 May 1992) is a Vietnamese model and beauty pageant titleholder of the Rade ethnic minority group. After winning Miss Universe Vietnam 2017, she represented Vietnam at Miss Universe 2018 and  placed in the top 5. She was the first Miss Universe participant from Vietnam to be from an ethnic minority group.

Early life
H'Hen Niê was born in Cư M’gar, Đắk Lắk Province to parents Y'Krin Êban and H'Ngơn Niê. She comes from the Rade ethnic minority, and speaks the Rade language, a Chamic language, as her native language. H'Hen did not learn Vietnamese until eighth grade. H'Hen is the third oldest out of six children, and during her youth, she worked on a coffee farm to assist her family. Rade matrilineal customs meant that Rade women traditionally tend to start a family at a young age. However, H'Hen decided to break from this tradition and continue her studies throughout high school.

After graduating from high school, H'Hen studied for a year at Nha Trang National Ethnic Community College before moving to Ho Chi Minh City to study corporate finance at the College of Foreign Economic Relations. She worked as a domestic worker for a year to pay her bills while she was in college. When H'Hen was working as an intern at a bank, she began considering a career in modelling. In 2014, shortly after graduating from college, she was discovered by Đỗ Mạnh Cường while attempting to begin a modelling career. As she gained interest and fame in the industry, she auditioned for season 6 of Vietnam's Next Top Model in 2015.

Career

Pageantry

Miss Universe Vietnam 2017
H'Hen entered Miss Universe Vietnam 2017. During her time at Miss Universe Vietnam, she was recognized for her short hair, adventurous and outgoing personality, and tanned complexion, a contrast to the traditional Vietnamese beauty standard. In the finale, H'Hen Niê went on to win the competition, beating out first runner-up Hoàng Thùy and second runner-up Mâu Thị Thanh Thủy. Miss Universe 2008 Dayana Mendoza was a judge at the finale. When asked by a co-judge whom she would pick as the winner, Mendoza chose "the girl with short hair". As a Rade person, H'Hen Niê is currently the first and only Miss Universe Vietnam titleholder to be from an ethnic minority group, other than Kinh.

Miss Universe 2018

She represented Vietnam at Miss Universe 2018 in Bangkok, Thailand. In the months leading up to the pageant, H'Hen's training and preparation was documented and aired as a YouTube series called Road to Miss Universe 2018.

The Miss Universe Vietnam Organization held a contest to find the Vietnamese national costume that H'Hen would wear for the national costume competition at the pageant. Six designs made it to the final round. After a nationwide vote, the top three designs were selected: Bánh Mì (inspired by the Vietnamese sandwich bánh mì), Phố cổ (inspired by the ancient town of Hội An), and Ngũ hổ (inspired by the classical Hàng Trống painting and Vietnamese opera). In the end, Bánh Mì was selected to be Vietnam's national costume at Miss Universe 2018.

In the finale held at Impact Arena on December 17 in Bangkok, H'Hen finished as a top 5 finalist. In her top 5 interview, H'Hen received a question about whether the #MeToo movement has gone too far, for which she answered:

Post Miss Universe

She was selected as the winner of the 2018 Timeless Beauty Award by Missosology, the popular beauty pageant blog and magazine. She defeated 112 other women competing in different major beauty pageants in 2018. Timeless Beauty has been organized annually since 2010 as a tradition of Missosology to recognize a queen who best embodies beauty that will transcend time, “something that shall be remembered for all eternity."

While having moderate success prior to the pageant competition, H'Hen's modeling career significantly took off after she won Miss Universe Vietnam 2017. She became an ambassador for various brands and appeared on multiple magazine covers and editorial features. She has walked for multiple fashion shows in Vietnam and overseas.

In July 2019, she joined Lệ Hằng, Vietnam's representative at Miss Universe 2016, to compete in season 6 of The Amazing Race Vietnam as the Yellow Team. The team eventually won the race and received a cash prize of 300 million VND (approximately 13,000 USD). They committed to using the prize for charity work. She was the host of I Am Miss Universe Vietnam 2019, which premiered in October 2019. However, H'Hen had to halt her appearance in Miss Universe Vietnam 2019 due to health issues. She has denied rumors of conflict with the MUV organization or pregnancy, and continued to post about the competition on her personal social media.

Philanthropy
H'Hen believes in the efforts of education being key for rising out of poverty. She initially committed to donate 70% of her prizes if she won the title of Miss Universe Vietnam. However, after her win, she listened to her mother's advice and gave away all of her prize money worth $10,000 to providing scholarships to students in her old schools, and hoped her story could inspire youth to overcome their struggles and continue to pursue education in life. Under her Miss Universe Vietnam reign, H'Hen rallied for support for the unfortunate, the elderly as well as HIV/AIDS victims. She became a global ambassador for Room to Read in 2018, a non-profit organization focusing on providing resources for girls' education and literacy programs. As an ambassador, she has raised approximately $20,000 for a project to build a new library in Lam Dong and provide scholarships to girls in Asia and Africa so that they could complete secondary education school and develop key life skills. The library was inaugurated in October 2018, housing over 3500 titles for students at Bao Thuan Elementary School and the local community to use. She received "Star for the Community" award at Star of the Year 2018 gala for her charity work in Vietnam.

In February 2019, she spoke to 12,000 students at a conference organized by the Francis Padua Papica Foundation in Naga, Camarines Sur, Philippines where she shared her stories and affirmed her stance on believing in oneself to overcome one's challenges. A month later, H'Hen initiated a project that would provide sanitary water and common street lights to people in her village and hoped to complete the project before she ended her reign as Miss Universe Vietnam in late 2019.

Filmography

Television series

References

External links
A baguette-bedecked beauty queen bedevils bigots in Vietnam, The Economist, 5 Jan 2019
Official Instagram account

l

1992 births
Living people
Miss Universe 2018 contestants
People from Đắk Lắk Province
Rade people
Top Model contestants
Vietnamese beauty pageant winners
Vietnamese female models
The Amazing Race contestants
Reality show winners
21st-century Vietnamese women